The Mon State Cultural Museum (Burmese: မွန်ယဉ်ကျေးမှုပြတိုက်), formerly Mon Ethnic Cultural Museum, is a museum located at No 50, Htawai Bridge Road & Baho Road, in Mawlamyine, Mon State in Myanmar. It was established in 1955. It is under the management of Department of Archaeology and National Museum (Myanmar).

Collections

Mon culture 

The museum mainly displays traditional costumes, Buddhist artefacts, sculptures, palm-leaf manuscript, handicrafts, bronzeware, silverware, coins and figurines of the ethnic Mon people who founded one the earliest civilisations in Mainland Southeast Asia, and were responsible for the spread of Theravada Buddhism in Mainland Southeast Asia.  

Essentially, the museum houses ceramic art of Mon kingdoms including Martaban jars and Mon musical instruments that can only be seen in the world famous museums.  

Moreover, it exhibits a manuscript copy of Myazedi Stone Inscription (AD 1113) in Mon language and a replica of Ceremonial helmet of Queen regnant Shin Sawbu (the real one is at the V&A Museum, London).

Other cultures 
The museum also displays artefacts of the Pyu people, Taungoo culture and Konbaung culture including the 19th century divans used by Konbaung dynasty's Queen Seindon and Princess Myat Phaya Galay, who resided in Mawlamyine in the late 19th century or the early 20th century.

Entry 
Museum's opening hour is 09:30 AM - 04:30 PM (Tuesday to Sunday) except public holidays.

The museum entry fee are charged at 5,000 Kyats (approximately US$3) for foreign visitors, 500 Kyats for local adults and free-of-charges for school children.

See also

 Mon–Khmer languages
 Early history of Thailand
 Prehistory of Myanmar

References

Museums in Myanmar
Buildings and structures in Mon State
Museums established in 1990